Salamo Airport is an airfield serving Salamo, in the Milne Bay Province of Papua New Guinea.

Airlines and destinations
The airfield can be reached by chartered (unscheduled) flights from nearby airstrips with Airlines PNG and other Papua new Guinean charter airlines.

References

External links
 

Airports in Papua New Guinea
Milne Bay Province